The term therapeutic governance has been used multiply in the social science literature, referring to two interrelated concepts.  Therapeutic governance was first coined by Vannessa Pupavac to describe the management of the populations' psychology, and its significance for security. 

Allison McKim used the term therapeutic governance to describe the governmentality of alcohol and drug treatment, whereby treatment works as a type of responsibilizing governance in producing and managing a rational, self-interested subject.

References

Political philosophy
Security studies
Criminology
Social psychology